Mohammed al-Khabrani (born 14 October 1993) is a Saudi Arabian football player who currently plays as a center back for Pro League side Al-Khaleej and the Saudi Arabia national team.

Career statistics

Club

International
Statistics accurate as of match played 15 June 2021.

International goals
Scores and results list Saudi Arabia's goal tally first.

Honours
Al-Qadsiah
First Division: 2014–15

References

External links
 

Living people
1993 births
People from Khobar
Association football defenders
Saudi Arabian footballers
Al-Qadsiah FC players
Al-Ahli Saudi FC players
Khaleej FC players
Saudi First Division League players
Saudi Professional League players
Saudi Arabia international footballers